Errett Weir McDiarmid (July 13, 1909 – April 27, 2000) was an American librarian and academic who was president of the American Library Association from 1948 to 1949.  McDiarmid was born in West Virginia and received his bachelor's degree in 1929 from Texas Christian University and his master's degree in 1930, also from Texas Christian. He went on to receive a bachelor's degree in Library Science in 1931 from Emory University and his doctorate from the University of Chicago Graduate Library School in 1934.

McDiarmid was the librarian at Baylor University from 1934 to 1937 and went on to be an associate professor at the University of Illinois Library School and from 1943 to 1951 he served as the  university librarian and director of the Division of Library Instruction at the University of Minnesota. At the University of Minnesota, McDiarmid served as Dean of the College of Science, Literature and the Arts and on the faculty of the Library School and Graduate School. He established a Childrens Literature Research Collection in 1949 based on a donation by Irvine Kerlan.

In 1951, McDiarmid became Dean of the University of Minnesota School of Liberal Arts. In 1963, he was appointed Director of the Graduate School Fellowship Office where he worked until his retirement in 1978. He continued to volunteer in the University of Minnesota Special Collections unit, working with their Sherlock Holmes collections. McDiarmid helped found the Norwegian Explorers, a group of faculty that are Sherlock Holmes fans. He donated over 15,000 items of Holmes-related materials to the University of Minnesota in 1995.

Publications
 The Library Survey: Problems and Methods (1940)
 The Administration of the American Public Library (1943)

References

 

1909 births
2000 deaths
Librarians from West Virginia
Presidents of the American Library Association
University of Minnesota faculty
University of Chicago Graduate Library School alumni
Emory University alumni
Texas Christian University alumni